"I'll Fly Away" is a hymn written by Albert E. Brumley in 1929.

I'll Fly Away may also refer to:
I'll Fly Away (TV series)
"I'll Fly Away" (Banaroo song)
I'll Fly Away: Further Testimonies from the Women of York Prison, an anthology edited by Wally Lamb
I'll Fly Away (Homeland), an episode of the TV series Homeland

See also
"One Day I'll Fly Away", a song by Randy Crawford